is a song by Japanese enka singer Harumi Miyako. The song won the 18th Japan Record Awards' Grand Prix Award.

In popular culture 
The song played in the Lupin III Part 2 episode "The Great San Francisco Chase", but was removed from International releases that were used on Geneon DVDs and streaming sites for copyright reasons. The song plays as Koichi Zenigata falls asleep to the radio.

1975 singles
Enka songs
Japanese songs
Oricon Weekly number-one singles
1975 songs